is a 1999 Japanese supernatural thriller film directed by Shunichi Nagasaki and written by Kunimi Manda and Takenori Sento.

Plot summary
Years after moving to Tokyo with her parents, Hinako returns to her hometown in rural Shikoku. She soon learns that her childhood friend, Sayori, died several years ago and that Sayori's mother, a Shinto priestess(?) who used to perform séances and exorcisms, has gone almost insane with grief. After seeing Sayori's yūrei several times during the night, Hinako consults with some local experts on the paranormal and discovers that Sayori's mother has something planned for her daughter.

Cast
Yui Natsukawa as Hinako Myoujin
Michitaka Tsutsui as Fumiya Akizawa 
Chiaki Kuriyama as Sayori Hiura 
Toshie Negishi as Teruko Hiura (Sayori's mother) 
Ren Osugi as Yasutaka Hiura (Sayori's father) 
Makoto Satô as Sendo 
Taro Suwa as Oda 
Tomoko Otakara as Yukari Asakawa 
Haduki Kôzu as Chizuko Oono

Release
Shikoku was released in Japan on January 23, 1999 where it was distributed by Toho. It was released as a double feature with Ring 2. Shikoku was later shown at the Vancouver International Film Festival as part of a program of modern Japanese horror films at the festival, including Ring, Ring 2, Audition and Gemini.

The film was released directly to video in the United States on October 26, 2004 by Adness.

Reception
Jasper Sharp writing for Midnight Eye referred to the film as a "pedestrian addition to the late 1990s horror boom.", finding it "Hideo Nakata's high-concept popcorn movie Ring had proven pretty convincingly that the supernatural could be a lucrative cash cow in late-1990s recessional Japan. A contract job, co-written by one of Ring's original producers, Takenori Sento, and circulating on the lower half of a double bill with Ring 2, Shikoku is less an indication of either Bando or Nagasaki's thematic interests than an obvious attempt to milk the current interest in horror before it dried up. As such, it doesn't deviate too far from the path forged by its model in either style or formula. John Kenneth Muir in his book Horror Films of the 1990s gave the film a three and a half star rating out of five, finding the film "Beautifully shot and visually realized" and that the film had "more on its mind than scary dead girls with long hair"

References

Bibliography

External links 
 

1999 films
Films directed by Shunichi Nagasaki
Japanese ghost films
1990s Japanese-language films
Japanese horror thriller films
Japanese supernatural horror films
Folk horror films
1990s supernatural horror films
1990s horror thriller films
Toho films
1990s Japanese films